Tay Peng Kee  is a Singaporean former football forward, and a current manager/coach.

Tay played for Geylang International in Singapore, and also played for Singapore FA in the Malaysia Cup tournaments. Internationally, Tay played for Singapore and was in the Singapore's 1984 Asian Cup squad.

As a coach, Tay has coached Tampines Rovers in 1995, long before he becomes the team general manager in 2011. In 2012, Tay were also appointed as the Stags technical director, replacing Vorawan Chitavanich. In this capacity, Tay had also returned as head coach twice; first in June 2012, replacing Steven Tan for the rest of the 2012 S.League season. The second time was in the next 2013 S.League season, when Tay replaced Nenad Bacina in late May 2013 until the end of the season. On both occasions, Tay guided the Stags to win the league.

References

External links

Singaporesportsfan blog
Profile at Goal.com
1984 AFC Asian Cup Stats at rsssf.com

Living people
Singaporean footballers
Singapore international footballers
1984 AFC Asian Cup players
Singapore FA players
Geylang International FC players
Singaporean sportspeople of Chinese descent
Singaporean football managers
Tampines Rovers FC head coaches
Singapore Premier League head coaches
1961 births
Association football forwards